Heosimcheong Spa (허심청) is said to be the largest hot spring fed spa in Asia.

Located about 10 km north of downtown Busan, South Korea in its Dongnae district, it has facilities to accommodate 3000 guests on five floors. Known to have been bathed in by kings of Silla (57 BCE – 935 CE), the spring has been developed into a 4,300 m2 urban complex with 4 million visits a year.

The current building was completed in 1991. Segregated and largely duplicated by gender, facilities include hot, lukewarm and cool baths, fountains, saunas (including an "igloo" chilled to 0°C), mud baths, massage, exfoliation, and exercise rooms. The spring water is alkali, emerging at 45°C to 56°C, and has the highest concentration of magnesium in Korea. Forty different bath types are available, depending on the season, with different medicinal herbs and fruit essences, including cherry, pepper, lavender and citrus, mixed with the water. The complex also has a nightclub, a lounge, several banquet halls, a bakery, a bar (HurShimChung Bräu) and a Japanese restaurant, and is connected to a neighboring hotel by skywalk. O

References

External links
 Images of the different baths

Buildings and structures completed in 1991
Hot springs of South Korea
Tourist attractions in Busan
Destination spas
Restaurants in South Korea
Buildings and structures in Busan
1991 establishments in South Korea
20th-century architecture in South Korea